Umesha Thimashini (born 24 April 2001) is a Sri Lankan cricketer. In January 2019, she was named in Sri Lanka's squad for their series against South Africa. She made her Women's Twenty20 International cricket (WT20I) debut for Sri Lankan against South Africa Women on 1 February 2019. She made her Women's One Day International cricket (WT20I) debut for Sri Lanka, also against South Africa Women, on 11 February 2019.

In November 2019, she was named in Sri Lanka's squad for the women's cricket tournament at the 2019 South Asian Games. The Sri Lankan team won the silver medal, after losing to Bangladesh by two runs in the final. In January 2020, she was named in Sri Lanka's squad for the 2020 ICC Women's T20 World Cup in Australia.

In October 2021, she was named as one of five reserve players in Sri Lanka's team for the 2021 Women's Cricket World Cup Qualifier tournament in Zimbabwe.

References

External links

 

2001 births
Living people
Sri Lankan women cricketers
Sri Lanka women One Day International cricketers
Sri Lanka women Twenty20 International cricketers
Sportspeople from Galle
South Asian Games silver medalists for Sri Lanka
South Asian Games medalists in cricket